A Man for All Seasons may refer to:

Theater and film 
 A Man for All Seasons (play), a 1960 play by Robert Bolt
 A Man for All Seasons (1964 TV film), an Australian adaptation of Bolt's play
 A Man for All Seasons (1966 film), a British adaptation of the play
 A Man for All Seasons (1988 film), an American television adaptation of the play

Literature 
 A quotation from Vulgaria (1520) by Robert Whittington
 A Man for All Seasons, a 2010 novel by Heather MacAllister

Music 
 "A Man for All Seasons", a song by Al Stewart from Time Passages
 "A Man for All Seasons", a song by Concord Dawn from Chaos by Design
 "A Man for All Seasons", a song by Robbie Williams from the 2003 film Johnny English
 "A Man for All Seasons", a song by Stephen Ashbrook